The Andrews-Wing House is a historic house located in Boonville, Cooper County, Missouri.

Description and history 
It was built around 1855 for David Andrews, and is a one-story, vernacular brick dwelling with a variation of a hall and parlor plan. It has a brick ell and two-story frame addition. Also on the property is a contributing rusticated stone garage (c. 1920).

It was listed on the National Register of Historic Places on March 16, 1990.

References

Houses on the National Register of Historic Places in Missouri
Houses completed in 1855
Houses in Cooper County, Missouri
National Register of Historic Places in Cooper County, Missouri
Vernacular architecture in Missouri
1855 establishments in Missouri
Boonville, Missouri